Persatuan Sepakbola Indonesia Pangkal Pinang dan Sekitarnya or Persipas is an Indonesian football club based in Pangkal Pinang, the capital of Bangka Belitung Islands. They currently compete in the Liga 3. Their best achievement was when in the 2014 Liga Nusantara Bangka Belitung zone, they managed to become champions as well as qualify for the regional round of the 2014 Liga Nusantara. However, in 2018 Liga 3 Bangka Belitung Islands zone, they failed to became champions and finished runners-up in a 3–2 loss to PS Basel.

Honours
 Liga Nusantara (now: Liga 3) Bangka Belitung Islands
 Champion: 2014
 Runner-up: 2018

References

Football clubs in Indonesia
Football clubs in Bangka Belitung Islands